ʻAbd al-Rashīd (ALA-LC romanization of ) is a male Muslim given name, and in modern usage, surname. It is built from the Arabic words ʻabd and al-Rashīd, one of the names of God in the Qur'an, which give rise to the Muslim theophoric names. It means "servant of the right-minded".

Because the letter r is a sun letter, the letter l of the al- is assimilated to it. Thus although the name is written in Arabic with letters corresponding to Abd al-Rashid, the usual pronunciation corresponds to Abd ar-Rashid. Alternative transliterations include ‘Abd ar-Rasheed and others, all subject to variable spacing and hyphenation. 

It should not be confused with ʻAbd al-Rāshid.

It may refer to:

Politicians
Maulana Abdur Rashid Tarkabagish (1900–1986), Bangladeshi politician
Sardar Abdur Rashid Khan (1906 - ?1995), senior police officer and cabinet minister in Pakistan
Abdirashid Ali Shermarke (1919–1969), Prime Minister of Somalia
Chauhdry Abdul Rashid (born 1941), Pakistani-British politician
Maher Abd al-Rashid, (1942–2014), Iraqi general
Abdul Rashid Shaheen (born 1945), Indian politician
Abdul Rasheed Hussain (born 1946), Maldivian politician
Abdul Rashid Dostum (born 1954), Afghan soldier and politician
Abderrachid Boukerzaza (born 1955), Algerian politician
Abdirashid Mohamed Hidig, Somali politician
Abdur Rasheed Turabi, politician in Azad Jammu & Kashmir
Abdul Rashid Godil (born 1960), Pakistani politician
Omar Abdirashid Ali Sharmarke (born 1960), Prime Minister of Somalia
Abdur Rashid, Bangladeshi politician.
Abdur Rashid, Pakistani politician

Sports
Lala Abdul Rashid (1922–1988), member of Pakistan's 1960 Olympics field Hockey team
Muhammad Abdul Rashid (born 1941), Pakistani Olympic silver medallist in field hockey
Abdul Rasheed Baloch (born 1972), Pakistani boxer
Abdul Rashid Qambrani (born 1975), Pakistani boxer
Mohd Rafdi Abdul Rashid (born 1977), Malaysian footballer
Abdul Rashid (hurdler) (born 1979), Pakistani Olympic sprint hurdler
Abdur Rashid (cricketer) (born 1987), Bangladeshi cricketer
Abdulrashid Sadulaev (born 1996), Russian freestyle wrestler, two time Olympic gold medalist

Abdirashid mohamed Ursad (born 1974) in ogaden Region in Degahbur / Obolle 
Qais Abdur Rashid (575 - 661), legendary ancestor of the Pashtun race
Abdurashid Khan (1508–1560), ruler of Yarkand Khanate in Uyghurstan (Eastern Turkestan)
Abdurreshid Ibrahim (1857-1944), Russia-born Tatar Muslim scholar, journalist, and traveller
Abdul Rashid (judge) (1889–1981), Chief Justice of Pakistan
Abdur Rashid Kardar (1904–1989), Pakistani actor and director
Abdul Rashid Khan (born 1908), Indian musician
Abdul Rashid (agriculturist) (born 1950), Pakistani Agricultural Scientist and Bioscientist
Abdul Rashid Ghazi (ca. 1964 −2007), Pakistani Muslim cleric
Abdirashid Duale, Somali businessman

My Name is abdirashid

Arabic masculine given names